Cities is the third studio album by American alternative rock band Anberlin, released on February 20, 2007. The songs "Godspeed" and "The Unwinding Cable Car" were released as singles with accompanying music videos. The album debuted at No. 19 on the Billboard 200.

Production 
The band spent more than 40 days in the studio recording Cities and went back on tour on September 14 after listening to the finished work on the morning of September 13. Lead singer Stephen Christian kept fans posted on progress in the studio through the band's online forums. Anberlin asked fans to message their phone numbers to the band through their message board so they could call the fans and ask for advice on the album. The album was produced by Aaron Sprinkle, who also produced Anberlin's first two albums Blueprints for the Black Market and Never Take Friendship Personal.

Promotion and pre-release 
In late 2006, the band started previewing content for the album in various ways. The song "Godspeed" was released as a single on December 28, 2006. The band started playing "Hello Alone" at concerts under its working title, "The Lesser Thans." Anberlin also posted individual song previews on MySpace and PureVolume.

Lyrical content 
Stephen Christian stated in an interview that the lyrics throughout the band's discography were progressively becoming more mature. "The first CD (Blueprints for the Black Market) was childish in the manner that it was Man vs. World in the lyrics. The second (Never Take Friendship Personal) was Man Vs. Man. Cities is more adult in the manner that it's Man vs. Self."

Release 
Cities was released in the United States on February 20, 2007, as scheduled. It sold 34,000 units in its first week of release and debuted at No. 19 on the Billboard 200 chart and was well received by critics and fans.  It also reached up to number seven on the iTunes Top Albums chart. Some pre-orders were shipped along with a seven-inch collector's vinyl EP.

A special-edition version of the album was also released.  This version contains three additional tracks and a bonus DVD featuring a behind the scenes look of the making the album, interviews with the band members, and outtakes.

Except for digitally downloaded albums, each US copy of the album contained a "City Pass" insert. This insert states that it is the buyer's "gateway to the world" providing "free entry to over twenty cities". The inserts were tied to an online-entry contest (which closed on August 31, 2007).

Critical reception

Cities garnered critical acclaim from Music critics. At Christianity Today, Christa Banister rated the album four stars, calling it a "great step in the right direction." Greg Prato of Allmusic rated the album three-and-a-half stars, commenting that "Nothing too groundbreaking here, but nothing cringe-worthy, either." At CCM Magazine, Andrew Scates graded it a B, noting that the album "if anything, evokes a hope for the future." Drew Beringer of AbsolutePunk rated the album an eighty-five-percent, highlighting that the album "converted" him about the band's music because it "display a vast improvement in every aspect." At Christian Broadcasting Network, Jennifer E. Jones rated the album four spins, affirming that "The best Anberlin album is here." Trevor Fitzgerald of Cross Rhythms rated the album a nine squares, stating that the listener will "find memorable songs, finely executed." At Sputnikmusic, SowingSeason rated the album a perfect five stars, saying that the album "shows Anberlin coming to a crossroads between youth and maturity and creating an absolute masterpiece of both." Founder, John DiBiase of Jesus Freak Hideout rated the album four stars, writing that the band "craft[ed] a pretty impressive batch of songs." At New Release Tuesday, Kevin Davis rated the album a perfect five stars, evoking that the album "demands to be experienced over and over." Also, Jonathan Francesco of New Release Tuesday rated the album a perfect five stars, calling it "an album of epic quality." The Phantom Tollbooth's James Morovich rated the album four stars, highlighting this as "Anberlin's most diverse project to date", and noting how the listener "will find a lot here to enjoy as well!" At Melodic, Kaj Roth rated the album three stars, remarking how the release offers "good songs that has elements of The Smiths, believe it or not."

Accolades
In 2008, the album was nominated for a Dove Award for Recorded Music Packaging of the Year at the 39th GMA Dove Awards.

Track listing

Notes Special Edition version includes a DVD behind the scenes of the making of Cities.
The bonus tracks are also included in the compilation album Lost Songs''
The album released in Japan had an extra track titled "The Haunting."
"The Haunting" was later released on the Lost Songs album in late 2007, but Anberlin did not play the song live until September 28, 2010 at the New Orleans House of Blues.

 Personnel AnberlinStephen Christian – lead vocals, keyboards
Joseph Milligan – lead guitar, vocals
Nathan Strayer – rhythm guitar, vocals
Deon Rexroat – bass guitar
Nathan Young – drums, percussionAdditional musiciansAaron Marsh – vocals on "Inevitable"
Aaron Mlasko – additional percussion
Matt Slocum – strings and choirs arrangementArtworkRyan Clark for Invisible Creature – art direction & design
Parker Young – photography
Rob Michael Hugel - video documentaryProductionAaron Sprinkle – producer
Randy Torres – engineering
Mike Shipley – mixing
Brian Wohlgermuth – mixing assistant
Ted Jensen – mastering at Sterling Sound, New York City 
Aaron Mlasko – drum techManagement Chad Johnson – A&R
Kyle Griner – Management for The Arson Madia Group, Inc
Nick Storch – U.S. Booking for The Arson Madia Group
Mark Ngui h – European Booking for Primary Talent
Mirk McKoy – Legal for Serling, Roook, & Ferrara 

ChartsAlbum'''

References

External links
 Album page for Cities
 

Anberlin albums
2007 albums
Tooth & Nail Records albums
Albums produced by Aaron Sprinkle